Serenje is a town of Serenje District, Zambia, lying just off the Great North Road and TAZARA Railway. Serenje has a railway station on the TAZARA railway. Serenje is  approximately 191 km from Kapiri Mposhi on the Great North Road. Mkushi is the district west of Serenje.  The Mulembo Falls lie near the town.

Economy 
The inhabitants of Serenje district engage in subsistence agriculture.  Though the area is blessed with rich soils and thick forests, economic development appears to have eluded this Zambian rural outpost.

Society
Serenje is home to the Lala people whose primary language is ciLala.
The Lala language, like most languages spoken on the Copperbelt and Central provinces of Zambia, is classified as belonging to the Bemba language group. The Lala people, like most ethnic groups in central and northern and northwestern parts of Zambia, are said to have descended from the Luba-Lunda Kingdom in present-day Congo DRC.
Serenje district is constituted by a number of Chiefdoms. These are the chiefdoms of Muchinda, Muchinka, Chisomo, Serenje, Kabamba, Mailo, and Chibale.

Transport 
In 2015, raillink to Chipata and Malawi was proposed.

Personalities
Emeli Sandé's father went to Kabamba Primary School in Serenje.

See also 
 Railway stations in Zambia
 Chief Chitambo (Kafinda)

References

External links 
 UN Map

Populated places in Central Province, Zambia